Ttujur or T’t’ujur or Tytudzhur or Tudzhur or Ttudzhur may refer to:
Ttujur, Aragatsotn, Armenia
Ttujur, Gegharkunik, Armenia